The Lunenfeld-Tanenbaum Research Institute is a medical research institute in Toronto, Ontario and part of the Sinai Health System. It was originally established in 1985 as the Samuel Lunenfeld Research Institute, the research arm of Mount Sinai Hospital, by an endowment from the Lunenfeld and Kunin families. It was renamed to the current name on June 24, 2013, after a $35 million donation from Larry and Judy Tanenbaum.

It comprises 36 principal investigators, has a budget of C$90 million (2005/6), has over 200 trainees and approximately 600 staff. The institute conducts research into various forms of cancer (colon, breast, pancreatic, prostate, lung, etc.), neurological disorders and brain illnesses, women's and infants' health, diabetes, developmental biology, stem cell biology and tissue regeneration, mouse models of human disease, genomic medicine and systems biology. The institute has  of space and is split between the main hospital and the Joseph and Wolf Lebovic Health Complex.

The Lunenfeld-Tanenbaum Research Institute is a world pioneer in the fields of Systems Biology, Diabetes, and Infectious Bowel Disease. Its Systems Biology team consistently ranked Top 5 worldwide. Researchers at the Lunenfeld have the highest per capita funding and citations in Canada.

The founding director was Louis Siminovitch (1984–1994), followed by Alan Bernstein (1995–2000), Janet Rossant and Anthony Pawson (2001–2002), Anthony Pawson (2002–2005) and James Woodgett (2005–).

Funding 
Researchers are supported by the Mount Sinai Hospital Foundation, donors and external funding sources including:

 Canada Foundation for Innovation
 Canadian Cancer Society
 Canadian Institutes of Health Research
 Genome Canada
 Lawson Health Research Institute
 March of Dimes
 National Institutes of Health
 Natural Sciences and Engineering Research Council
 Ontario Ministry of Health and Long-Term Care
 SickKids Foundation
 Susan G. Komen Breast Cancer Foundation
 Terry Fox Foundation
 University Health Network

References

External links
 

Medical research institutes in Canada
Laboratories in Canada
Research institutes established in 1985
1985 establishments in Ontario